Imil Irfanovich Sharafetdinov (born November 2, 1987) is a Russian Greco-Roman wrestler of Tatar descent. He is Greco-Roman bronze medalist in 2010 Wrestling World Championships 2010, twice medalist in Russian Greco-Roman nationals, international master of sports in Greco-Roman wrestling, silver medalist in World Cup 2016. World Military Champion 2018 in the 82 kilos.

He is a three-time Russian national champion (2010, 2012, 2018).

References

External links
 bio on fila-wrestling.com

Living people
1987 births
Tatar people
Russian Muslims
Russian male sport wrestlers
World Wrestling Championships medalists